Kazimierz Sporny DFC (17 February 191617 May 1949) was a Polish fighter ace of the Polish Air Force in World War II with 5 confirmed kills.

Biography
Sporny was born in 1916, he was graduated from the Polish Air Force Academy in 1936. He was assigned to the 3rd Aviation Regiment. On 17 September he crossed the border with Romania then via Yugoslavia and Italy he reached France. After the Battle of France he arrived in  the UK where he served in the No. 303 Polish Fighter Squadron. Sporny scored his first victory on 30 December 1940 on a Bf 109. He volunteered to the Polish Fighting Team.

On 18 July 1946 he married Margaret McArthur.

Kazimierz Sporny died from a brain cancer on 17 May 1949. On 25 August 2016 his remains were brought to Poznań by Polish Air Force's CASA C-295 and buried in Miłostowo cemetery, with an honorary flypast by the F-16 fighter jets.

Aerial victory credits
 Bf 109 4 – September 1940 (probably destroyed)
 Bf 109 – 30 December 1940
 Bf 109 – 7 April 1943
 2 Bf 109 – 22 April 1943
 Bf 109 – 24 June 1944
 Fw 190 – 24 June 1944 (damaged)

Awards
 Virtuti Militari, Silver Cross
 Cross of Valour (Poland), three times
 Distinguished Flying Cross (United Kingdom)

References

Further reading
 Tadeusz Jerzy Krzystek, Anna Krzystek: Polskie Siły Powietrzne w Wielkiej Brytanii w latach 1940-1947 łącznie z Pomocniczą Lotniczą Służbą Kobiet (PLSK-WAAF). Sandomierz: Stratus, 2012, p. 531. 
 Piotr Sikora: Asy polskiego lotnictwa. Warszawa: Oficyna Wydawnicza Alma-Press. 2014, p. 367-371. 
 Józef Zieliński: Asy polskiego lotnictwa. Warszawa: Agencja lotnicza ALTAIR, 1994, p. 68. ISBN 83862172. 
 Cyrk Skalskiego | Kazimierz Sporny

The Few
Polish World War II flying aces
Recipients of the Silver Cross of the Virtuti Militari
1949 deaths
1916 births
Recipients of the Distinguished Flying Cross (United Kingdom)
Deaths from brain cancer in England